Club Anthems may refer to:

Club Anthems (Ballboy album)
Club Anthems (album series)
Club Anthems Vol. 1 2004 
Club Anthems Vol. 2 2005
Club Anthems Vol. 3 2006